Fairland High School (FHS) is a public high school in Proctorville, Ohio, United States.  It is the only high school in the Fairland Local School District. The school and district have been rated "Excellent" by the ODE multiple times. At least 85% of the student population is proficient in math and 62% in reading.

History
Fairland High School was formed in 1949 as a consolidation of Proctorville High School and Rome Rural High School. From 1949-1956, students attended school at the former Rome Rural HS. In 1956, a new building was opened adjacent to the Lawrence County Fairgrounds, hence the name "Fairland", and would remain the district's high school until 2002. In 2003, the current building opened and the 1956 building was renovated and transformed into Fairland Middle School.

Athletics
Fairland High School is a member of the Ohio Valley Conference (OVC) along with Chesapeake, Coal Grove (Dawson-Bryant), Ironton, Portsmouth, Rock Hill, South Point,  Gallia Academy.

The Dragons and Lady Dragons compete in Baseball, Basketball (Boys and Girls), Cross Country (Boys and Girls), Football, Soccer (Boys and Girls), Softball, Indoor and Outdoor Track & Field (Boys and Girls), Tennis (Boys), Swimming (Girls) Volleyball, and Wrestling.

The Dragons Football Team has won the OVC Championship 11 times (1967, 1972, 1973, 1974, 1975, 1984, 1985, 1993, 1997, 2008, and 2013) and have advanced to the OHSAA playoffs 3 times (1993, 2003, 2013.)

The boys and girls basketball teams have enjoyed a long history of success including multiple conference, district, and regional titles.
The 1961 Dragons Basketball team is known locally as "The Untouchables". The team finished the regular season with a perfect record going  on to win the sectional, district, and regional titles before falling in the state semi-final round.

The 2014 and 2015 Lady Dragons Basketball teams captured district and regional titles before falling in the OHSAA State semifinals.

James Carter, who wore no. 60, sustained a brain injury during a game in 1952, while playing Portsmouth East High School. The injury affected his respiratory system and he died. The Fairland Dragons football team retired no. 60 in 2010.

References

External links
 District Website

High schools in Lawrence County, Ohio
Public high schools in Ohio